

Offseason 
 December 4, 1957: Early Wynn and Al Smith were traded by the Indians to the Chicago White Sox for Minnie Miñoso and Fred Hatfield.
 January 29, 1958: Mickey Vernon was selected off waivers by the Indians from the Boston Red Sox.
 February 18, 1958: Hank Aguirre and Jim Hegan were traded by the Indians to the Detroit Tigers for Jay Porter and Hal Woodeshick.
 February 25, 1958: Pete Mesa (minors) was traded by the Indians to the Washington Senators for Milt Bolling.
 March 27, 1958: Vito Valentinetti and Milt Bolling were traded by the Indians to the Detroit Tigers for Pete Wojey and $20,000.
 Prior to 1958 season (exact date unknown)
Doc Edwards was signed as an amateur free agent by the Indians.
Jim Weaver was signed as an amateur free agent by the Indians.

Regular season 
 May 17, 1958: Carroll Hardy hit his first major league home run when he pinch hit for Roger Maris in the 11th inning of a 4–4 tie against the Chicago White Sox.
 Indians manager Bobby Bragan was fired after 67 games, the shortest stint (at the time) for a Cleveland Indians manager.

Season standings

Record vs. opponents

Notable transactions 
 June 12, 1958: Chico Carrasquel was traded by the Indians to the Kansas City Athletics for Billy Hunter.
 June 15, 1958: Roger Maris, Dick Tomanek and Preston Ward were traded by the Indians to the Kansas City Athletics for Woodie Held and Vic Power.
 July 2, 1958: Bob Lemon was released by the Indians.
 July 2, 1958: Morrie Martin was selected off waivers by the Indians from the St. Louis Cardinals.
 August 4, 1958: Randy Jackson was purchased by the Indians from the Los Angeles Dodgers.
 August 23, 1958: Hoyt Wilhelm was selected off waivers from the Indians by the Baltimore Orioles.

Opening Day Lineup

Roster

Player stats

Batting

Starters by position 
Note: Pos = Position; G = Games played; AB = At bats; H = Hits; Avg. = Batting average; HR = Home runs; RBI = Runs batted in

Other batters 
Note: G = Games played; AB = At bats; H = Hits; Avg. = Batting average; HR = Home runs; RBI = Runs batted in

Pitching

Starting pitchers 
Note: G = Games pitched; IP = Innings pitched; W = Wins; L = Losses; ERA = Earned run average; SO = Strikeouts

Other pitchers 
Note: G = Games pitched; IP = Innings pitched; W = Wins; L = Losses; ERA = Earned run average; SO = Strikeouts

Relief pitchers 
Note: G = Games pitched; W = Wins; L = Losses; SV = Saves; ERA = Earned run average; SO = Strikeouts

Awards and honors 

All-Star Game

Farm system 

LEAGUE CHAMPIONS: Burlington, North Platte

Notes

References 
1958 Cleveland Indians team page at Baseball Reference
1958 Cleveland Indians team page at www.baseball-almanac.com

External links
1958 Cleveland Indians Schedule and Statistics  at MLB.com

Cleveland Indians seasons
Cleveland Indians season
Cleveland Indians